Shishira is the season of winter in the Hindu calendar. It comprises the months of Pausha and Magha or mid-January to mid-March in the Gregorian calendar.

References

Sources 
Selby, Martha Ann (translator). The Circle of Six Seasons, Penguin, New Delhi, 2003, 
 Raghavan, V. Ṛtu in Sanskrit literature, Shri Lal Bahadur Shastri Kendriya Sanskrit Vidyapeetha, Delhi, 1972.

Hindu calendar
Seasons